Maroun Gantous (also Maron Ghantous or Maroun Gantus, ; born ) is an Israeli footballer who plays for Bnei Sakhnin.

Early life
Gantous was born in Sakhnin, Israel, to a Christian-Arab family.

Career
Gantous started his career in Bnei Sakhnin. On 5 January 2017 made his debut in the 3–1 win against Maccabi Sha'arayim.

Career statistics

References

External links
 

1996 births
Living people
Israeli footballers
Arab citizens of Israel
Arab-Israeli footballers
Bnei Sakhnin F.C. players
Liga Leumit players
Israeli Premier League players
Israel international footballers
Footballers from Sakhnin
Association football defenders
Israeli Arab Christians
Israel under-21 international footballers